Albicetus is a genus of stem-sperm whales that lived during the Miocene Epoch, around 15 million years ago, and was discovered in Santa Barbara, California in 1909. It was categorized for decades as belonging to a group of extinct walruses erroneously thought to be sperm whales. It was named Albicetus, meaning "white whale", is a reference to the leviathan in Herman Melville's classic 1851 novel Moby-Dick.

Taxonomy

Etymology
The genus Albicetus derives from the Latin albus "white" and cetus "whale", and so literally means "white whale". It was named in reference to the antagonist Moby Dick from Herman Melville's novel Moby-Dick. This reference was done both in honor of Melville and as a reference to the most notable traits of the Moby Dick–including an "unwonted magnitude", light color, and a crooked and deformed lower jaw–which coincidentally also describe the traits found in the Albicetus oxymycterus holotype specimen (the fossils themselves possess a light hue).

The species name oxymycterus is derived from the Ancient Greek ὀξύς oxy "sharp" and μυκτήρ mycter "nose".

Taxonomic history
The holotype was recovered from an unspecified location in the sea cliffs near the original Santa Barbara Lighthouse in 1909, which is believed to most likely be part of the Monterey Formation.
The whale was originally placed in the genus Ontocetus in 1925 by American naturalist Remington Kellogg as O. oxymycterus. This genus was originally thought to represent a sperm whale, however, in 2008, the type species, Ontocetus emmonsi, was discovered to actually be a walrus. The whale was then moved to the wastebasket taxon Scaldicetus, which consists of various other (more-or-less unrelated) primitive sperm whales with enamel coated teeth. In 2015, the whale was moved to the newly erected genus Albicetus.

Phylogeny
Albicetus, unlike the modern sperm whale (Physeter macrocephalus), possessed functional and enamel-coated teeth in both jaws. This suggests that it is related to the group of macroraptorial sperm whales which includes Acrophyseter, Brygmophyseter, Livyatan, and Zygophyseter. However, Albicetus is most similar in general shape and characteristics with Aulophyseter morricei, except for the dentition in which the latter possesses only small, vestigial upper teeth lacking enamel. The closest known relative to Albicetus is currently Livyatan.

Albicetus contains only one species A. oxymycterus.

Description

The type specimen, USNM 10923, consists of a partial skull (mainly remains of the beak) and isolated tooth fragments.

The whale had a maximum of 18 teeth in either jaw, deeply rooted in exceedingly large tooth sockets.

Paleoecology
For macroraptorial sperm whales, the presence of large body size along with large tooth size suggests that body size was an adaptation to hunting bigger prey, notably other marine mammals, as opposed to the modern sperm whale where size is possibly an adaptation to deep diving. The Langhian is particularly rich in sperm whale diversity, with Albicetus, Brygmophyseter, and Aulophyseter contemporaneously inhabiting the North Pacific. It is possible these sperm whales exhibited niche partitioning to avoid directly competing for food.

References

External links

Sperm whales
Prehistoric toothed whales
Miocene cetaceans
Miocene mammals of North America
Prehistoric cetacean genera
Fossil taxa described in 2015
Paleontology in California